Hoy (from Old Norse , meaning "high island") is an island in Orkney, Scotland, measuring  – the second largest in the archipelago, after Mainland. A natural causeway, the Ayre, links the island to the smaller South Walls; the two islands are treated as one entity by the UK census. Hoy lies within the parish of Stromness.

History 

The Dwarfie Stane lies in the north of the Rackwick valley and dates back to around 3000 BCE. It is unique in northern Europe, bearing similarity to Neolithic or Bronze Age tombs around the Mediterranean. The tomb has a small rectangular entrance and cleft, hence its name. Discoveries have been made on Mainland, Orkney, at the Ness of Brodgar that date back as early as 3510 BCE with the first stone circle in the British Isles found there.

The two most northerly Martello Towers in the UK stand here, built in 1814 to defend merchant shipping in the natural harbour of Longhope against privateers commissioned by United States President James Madison, who declared war in 1812.

World Wars 
The main naval base for the British fleet in both the First and Second World Wars, Scapa Flow, was at Lyness in the southeast of the island.

During the early years of World War II, up to 12,000 personnel were based in and around Lyness to support the defences of the naval anchorage at Scapa Flow and the ships that used it. To support this huge population, hundreds of accommodation huts were built in a number of camps around Lyness. A large wharf was built (known as the Golden Wharf because of its huge cost) along with a series of piers and slipways. Offices, workshops, stores and recreational buildings were erected, including a cinema, a theatre and several churches. An earlier headquarters building was replaced in 1943 by an imposing concrete HQ and communications centre, also sited high on Wee Fea, which now serves as a hotel.

Demographics
Although the population of Hoy is now only around 400, there was a much larger population in the past. In 1890 there were four schools on the island and four churches, suggesting a much larger population. Despite the larger population there was no paved road between the north of the island and the south, only a footpath. There was, however, an unsurfaced road between the two villages on the north of the isle; Rackwick and Moaness.

Geography 
The Old Man of Hoy, a sea stack formed from Old Red Sandstone, can be found in the northwest, on the Rackwick coast. The Old Man is popular with climbers, and was first climbed in 1966. Created by the erosion of a cliff through hydraulic action sometime after 1750, the stack is no more than a few hundred years old, and a painting from 1817 shows the stack with an arch at the bottom which has now further eroded and no longer remains. It may soon collapse into the sea.

The dramatic coastline of Hoy can be seen by visitors travelling to Orkney by ferry from the Scottish mainland. It has some of the highest sea cliffs in the UK at St John's Head, which reach .

The name Hoy comes from the Norse word Háey meaning "high island". It is therefore not surprising that the island of Hoy is the most mountainous in the Orkney archipelago. There is a trig point at the summit.

Hoy is also the name of a hamlet in the northeast of the island.

The island is part of the Hoy and West Mainland National Scenic Area, one of 40 in Scotland.

One of Orkney's few woodlands is found on Hoy, and is among the most northerly areas of woodland in the UK. Patches of the woodland are scattered across the island and most significantly there is the remote possibility of locally extant Orkney charr (Salvelinus inframundus) documented in 1908 at Heldale Water.

Transport

Airport
There have been two airfields on South Walls, perhaps due to its connections with the navy. One on the southern coast (Snelsetter) which opened in August 1934 and was closed at the end of World War Two; it was used by military and civil aircraft, and now is open land. Another, just east of the causeway that links the two islands of Hoy and South Walls, opened in November 1972 and closed in 1993. It was used by civilian aircraft solely and was operated by the airline Loganair; it is also now open land, used as an emergency landing strip only. The first flight to a nearby island of Flotta on 1 March 1977 was recorded to have landed at Hoy.

Ferry
Orkney Ferries traverse the west of Scapa Flow on two routes:

Lyness on Hoy and Longhope on associated Walls via small Flotta to/from the village of Houton on Mainland, Orkney.
Moaness in Hoy via small Graemsay to/from the town of Stromness on Orkney Mainland.

Bus
The Hoy and Walls Community Bus provides a regular timetabled bus service across the islands of Hoy and Walls. The buses go from Moaness on Hoy to Hackness on South Walls, via Linksness, Lyness, North Walls, Brims, and Longhope.

Longhope lifeboat station 
A lifeboat has been on Hoy since 1874, at first housed in a prominent stone building close to the west end of the causeway that links the two islands of Hoy and South Walls together. It was stationed there as it meant that the lifeboat could be dragged over wooden skids and into the sea in either North Bay, giving access to Scapa Flow, or in Aith Hope, an offshoot of the notorious Pentland Firth to the south. The shed continued to serve as the base of the Longhope lifeboat until 1906, when it was replaced.

The lifeboat station that stands slightly to the south of the original station cost £2,700 to build in 1906 and was in use until 1999. The original station is the home of the Longhope Lifeboat Museum, which has on display lifeboat Thomas McCunn, stationed here from 1933 to 1962.

Whilst based at this station, 17 March 1969 the lifeboat 'T.G.B.' ON 962 capsized while on service to the Liberian vessel Irene and her entire crew of eight lost their lives. In August of that year an Arun-class lifeboat, Sir Max Aitken II became the Longhope lifeboat. This class was designed to stay permanently afloat, and the decision was taken to move her to purpose-built moorings at Longhope pier. The lifeboats that have served here since have also been stationed at Longhope, including the current vessel the Helen Comrie (a Tamar class lifeboat) and her predecessor The Queen Mother, which was based here between 2004 and 2006. A station has been built where the lifeboat is moored at Longhope which is also the main harbour for boats to and from the island.

Mythology 
In Norse mythology, Hoy hosted Hjaðningavíg, the never-ending battle between Heðin and Högni.

Wildlife
Hoy is an Important Bird Area.
The northern part of the island is an RSPB reserve due to its importance for birdlife, particularly great skuas and red-throated divers. It was sold to the RSPB by the Hoy Trust for a nominal amount.
Anastrepta orcadensis, a liverwort also known as Orkney Notchwort, was first discovered on Ward Hill by William Jackson Hooker in 1808.

The northern and western parts of Hoy, along with much of the adjoining sea area, is designated as a Special Protection Area due to its importance for nine breeding bird species: arctic skua, fulmar, great black-backed gull, great skua, guillemot, Black-legged kittiwake, peregrine falcon, puffin and red-throated diver. The area is important for its seabird assemblage, which regularly supports 120,000 individual seabirds during the breeding season.

In popular culture
Hoy is featured prominently in the 1984 music video "Here Comes The Rain Again" by the Eurythmics.

Hoy has a performing arts theatre, the Gable End Theatre, which opened in 2000 and has a capacity of 75. The theatre is managed by the Hoy and Walls drama community.

Some rather incongruous Art Deco structures nearby date from this period. The Arts and Crafts architect William Lethaby rebuilt Melsetter house for mountaineer Thomas Middlemore at the end of the nineteenth century, leaving untouched the adjacent barn which is probably mid-18th century.

In Poul Anderson's story "The Bitter Bread" the protagonist lives in secluded retirement on Hoy and sets down reminiscences of his stormy life. There is a description of the island: "Steep red and yellow cliffs, sea green in sunlight or gray under clouds until it breaks in whiteness and thunder, gulls riding a cold loud wind, inland the heather and a few gnarly trees across hills where sheep graze, a hamlet of rough and gentle Orkney folk an hour's walk away, my cat, my books, my rememberings."

Gallery

See also 

 List of islands of Scotland

Notes

References

External links

Island of Hoy website launched December 2008
Old Man of Hoy picture gallery

 
Islands of the Orkney Islands
Important Bird Areas of Scotland
Locations in Norse mythology
National scenic areas of Scotland
Sites of Special Scientific Interest in Orkney
Royal Society for the Protection of Birds reserves in Scotland